Holy Cross Priory may refer to:
Holy Cross Priory, Cross-in-Hand, East Sussex, England 
Holy Cross Priory, Dalby, Sweden
Holy Cross Priory, Leicester, England
Priory of the Holy Cross, Rathfran, Ireland